The Singer World Series was a quadrangular ODI cricket tournament held in Sri Lanka from 4 to 17 September 1994. It featured the national cricket teams of Pakistan, Australia, India and the hosts, Sri Lanka. The competition was won by India, which defeated Sri Lanka in the final.

Background

Squads

Points table
The tournament was organised in a round robin format, with each team playing each other once.

Matches

Final

Records and awards
Sri Lanka's captain Arjuna Ranatunga won the player of the series award; India's Sachin Tendulkar won the batsmen of the series award; and Australia's Steve Waugh was awarded the bowler of the series award.

References

External links
 Tournament home at ESPN Cricinfo

Singer World Series
International cricket competitions from 1991–92 to 1994
Cricket